Karl Rudolf "Charlie" Bauerfeind (born 30 May 1963) is a German sound engineer and producer who has worked mostly with power metal bands such as Angra, Blind Guardian, Helloween, Primal Fear, Rage, HammerFall and Saxon.

Works

Production

Angra 
 Angels Cry – 1993
 Holy Land – 1995/1996
 Freedom Call – 1996

Blind Guardian 
 Nightfall in Middle-Earth – 1997/1998 (mixing of "Mirror Mirror" track, various recordings)
 A Night at the Opera – 2000/2001
 A Twist in the Myth – 2006
 At the Edge of Time – 2010
 Beyond the Red Mirror – 2015

Freedom Call 
 Stairway to Fairyland – 1999
 Crystal Empire – 2001
 Eternity – 2002 (mixing)

Gamma Ray 
 Insanity and Genius – 1993 (mixing)
 Land of the Free – 1994/1995
 Somewhere Out in Space – 1997 (mixing)

Gotthard 
 Bang! 2014

HammerFall 
 Crimson Thunder – 2002
 Chapter V: Unbent, Unbowed, Unbroken – 2005
 Threshold – 2006
 No Sacrifice, No Victory – 2009

Helloween 
 The Dark Ride – 2000
 Treasure Chest – 2002
 Rabbit Don't Come Easy – 2003
 Keeper of the Seven Keys: The Legacy – 2005
 Gambling with the Devil – 2007
 Unarmed – Best of 25th Anniversary – 2009
 7 Sinners – 2010
 Straight Out of Hell – 2013
 My God-Given Right – 2015
 Helloween – 2021

Joacim Cans 
 Beyond the Gates – 2004

Molly Hatchet 
 Silent Reign of Heroes – 1998 (mixing)

Rage 
Unity – 2002
Soundchaser – 2003
Speak of the Dead – 2006 (mixing)
Carved in Stone – 2008 (mixing)
Strings to a Web – 2010
21 – 2012

Saxon 
 Metalhead – 1999
 Lionheart – 2004
 The Inner Sanctum – 2007
 Into the Labyrinth – 2009

ShadowIcon 
 Empire in Ruins – 2011
 Smoke and Mirrors – 2014

Tamas 
 The Dreamlake – 1994

Van Canto 
Hero (2008)
Tribe of Force (2010)
Dawn of the Brave (2014)

Viper 
 Evolution – 1992
 Vipera Sapiens – 1992

References

External links 
 Official website (archived)

German audio engineers
1963 births
Living people
People from Erlangen
Engineers from Bavaria